Denis Walter OAM, (born 3 January 1955) is an Australian radio presenter, baritone singer, recording artist and media personality who also presented television news for 16 years.

Career
Walter's music career has lasted over forty years and he has recorded 16 albums to date.

For 16 years until his final bulletin in November 2008 when he left to join Melbourne radio station 3AW full-time, Walter was a news presenter in regional Victoria for WIN Television (a former affiliate of the Nine Network). He has also hosted nightly televised Keno lottery draws and having presented the weather on Nine News in Melbourne earlier in his career, returned for a few weeks in December 2008/January 2009 to fill in for Livinia Nixon.

On 10 November 2008, Walter began hosting Afternoons on 3AW (693 AM) Melbourne, replacing Ernie Sigley who retired. Walter regularly performs at concerts throughout Victoria.

In August 2018, Walter was announced as a host for the first series on the Nine Network's new travel series Helloworld. Of course, he plus Sonia Kruger, Steven Jacobs and Lauren Phillips would exit from Nine and Giaan Rooney becomes the presenter on the Seven Network enters the show from Series 2.

In December 2019, 3AW announced that he will move to a new timeslot in 2020 as the host of a new local program, 3AW Nights replacing John Stanley. Dee Dee Dunleavy has been announced as Walters replacement. He is on a 3-year contract in this role, extendable for a further 3 years.

Community work
Walter is a patron for Cystic Fibrosis Australia, an ambassador for Dementia Australia, the Austin Hospital, Melbourne, Make A Wish Foundation (South West Victoria) and Barwon Health and also does work for the Neuroscience Foundation and a number of other charitable and community groups.

Walter is also the Patron for Samoyed Club of Victoria.  Denis also hosts the Carols By Candlelight in Dandenong every year.
Each year Walter hosts Carols by the Bay at Eastern Beach on the Geelong waterfront, a Christmas concert. He is also a long-standing performer since 1979 at Vision Australia's traditional Christmas Eve Carols by Candlelight event in Melbourne.

Honours
Walter was awarded an Order of Australia Medal in the 2015 Queen's Birthday Honours list "for service to the performing arts as a singer and entertainer, and to the broadcast media."

Personal life
Walter is married with two stepdaughters and two grandsons. He currently lives in Geelong.

Discography

Albums

 Note: According to Walter's website, as of 2020, he has released 16 albums, therefore, there are four missing from the table above.

References

External links
Denis Walter Official website
3AW Afternoons with Denis Walter

3AW presenters
Australian male singers
Australian television presenters
1955 births
Living people
Australian broadcast news analysts
Musicians from Geelong
WIN News presenters